Paul Manning (December 3, 1959 in Madison, Wisconsin – January 2, 2005 in Sherman Oaks, California (of colorectal cancer)) was an American television producer and writer.

Career 
Manning learned the basics of his craft at the American Film Institute in Los Angeles. Manning started as a writer on L.A. Law. He won an Primetime Emmy Award for Outstanding Drama Series in 1996 for his work on ER. Mentioned ("in memory of our good friend”, and on the next line, “paul manning", all lower case) before the ending credits of ER on 1/13/2005, Season 11, Episode 10

References

External links

1959 births
2005 deaths
American television producers
American television writers
American male television writers
Businesspeople from Madison, Wisconsin
Writers from Madison, Wisconsin
Screenwriters from Wisconsin
20th-century American screenwriters
20th-century American businesspeople
20th-century American male writers